People's Democratic Union may refer to:

 Russian People's Democratic Union
 People's Democratic Union "New Ukraine"
 Popular Democratic Union (disambiguation)
 Democratic People's Union, Bosnia-Herzegowina

See also
 People's Democratic United Front, a former political coalition in Nepal
 People's Union (disambiguation)
 Democratic Union (disambiguation)